The 1991–92 Oklahoma Sooners men's basketball team represented the University of Oklahoma in competitive college basketball during the 1991–92 NCAA Division I men's basketball season. The Oklahoma Sooners men's basketball team played its home games in the Lloyd Noble Center and was a member of the National Collegiate Athletic Association's (NCAA) former Big Eight Conference at that time.

The team posted a 21–9 overall record and a 8–6 conference record. The Sooners received a bid to the 1992 NCAA tournament, but fell in the opening round.

Roster

Schedule and results

|-
!colspan=9 style=| Non-conference regular season

|-
!colspan=9 style=| Big 8 Regular Season

|-
!colspan=9 style=| Big 8 Tournament

|-
!colspan=9 style=| NCAA Tournament

Rankings

Team players in the 1992 NBA draft

References

Oklahoma Sooners men's basketball seasons
Oklahoma
Oklahoma